"Red Red Wine" is a song originally written, performed and recorded by American singer Neil Diamond in 1967 that appears on his second studio album, Just for You. The lyrics are written from the perspective of a person who finds that drinking red wine is the only way to forget his woes. This song is often mistaken for being a Bob Marley song.

UB40 recorded a cover version in 1983 that went to  1 in the UK and was moderately successful in the United States. It was rereleased in 1988 and went to No. 1 on the Billboard Hot 100.

Neil Diamond version
When Diamond left the Bang Records label in 1968, the label continued to release his singles, often adding newly recorded instruments and background vocals to album tracks from his two albums for Bang. For the "Red Red Wine" single, Bang added a background choir without Diamond's involvement or permission. Diamond's version reached No. 62 on the Billboard Hot 100 chart in 1968. Billboard described the single as a "compelling, original folk-flavored ballad."  Cash Box called it a "softie featuring a melancholy tale by a figure drowning his sorrow" with "dramatic vocal performance in a neatly styled arrangement."

A live version was released on Diamond's The Greatest Hits (1966–92), but the 1968 single version has never been issued on a vinyl album or CD. However, according to the liner notes in the booklet included in the 1996 box set In My Lifetime, the version of "Red Red Wine" erroneously indicates it is “from Bang single 556” but it is really the original, non-overdubbed mono album master of the track.  A review of the original 1996 release of this box set show Diamond also released a live version on Hot August Night (but not as a single.)

Several artists covered the song shortly after Diamond's recording was released:
 In 1968, Dutch singer Peter Tetteroo (from the band Tee-Set) had a hit with a version that reached No. 6 on the Dutch Top 40 chart.
 Jamaican-born singer Tony Tribe recorded a reggae version of the song in 1969 that reached No. 46 on the UK Singles Chart. It became Trojan Records' first chart hit.
 Vic Dana's cover became his last Hot 100 hit, peaking at No. 72 in June 1970.

Charts

UB40 version

UB40 recorded a version of "Red Red Wine" for their album of cover versions, Labour of Love. According to UB40 member Astro, the group's former vocalist and trumpet player, the band were only familiar with Tony Tribe's version and did not realize that the writer and original singer was Neil Diamond. Astro told the Financial Times, "Even when we saw the writing credit which said 'N Diamond,' we thought it was a Jamaican artist called Negus Diamond."

UB40's version features a lighter, reggae-style flavor compared to that of Diamond's somber, acoustic ballad. The UB40 version adds a toasted verse by Astro, opening: "Red Red Wine, you make me feel so fine/You keep me rocking all of the time," which was edited from the single that reached No. 1 on the UK Singles Chart in August 1983 and No. 34 in the U.S. in March 1984.

In 1988, UB40 performed the song at the Nelson Mandela 70th Birthday Concert. Soon after, program director Guy Zapoleon of Phoenix-based KZZP placed the full version, including Astro's "rap", on the station's playlist, and it soon became the station's most popular song. With UB40 ready to release Labour of Love II, A&M Records promotion man Charlie Minor asked UB40 to hold off on releasing the album so that the label could reissue and promote "Red Red Wine." On the Billboard Hot 100 chart of October 15, 1988, the song hit No. 1. In September 2014, the Official Charts Company announced that sales in the UK had reached one million.

Neil Diamond has stated that UB40's "Red Red Wine" is among his favorite covers of his songs. He frequently performs the song live using the UB40 reggae arrangement rather than that of the original version.

Charts

Weekly charts

Year-end charts

Certifications

Other cover versions
 Jimmy James and the Vagabonds released a 1968 cover version for the UK market. It charted at No. 36.
 Tony Tribe covered the song in 1969, reaching No. 46 on the UK chart.
 A 1970 remake by Vic Dana became a minor Billboard Hot 100 hit, peaking at No. 72, and reached No. 30 on the Adult Contemporary chart.
 In early 1972, singer Roy Drusky reached No. 17 on the Billboard Hot Country Singles chart and No. 16 on the RPM Country Tracks chart.
 In 1998, Sagarika released a Hindi cover version of "Red Red Wine" on her debut album Maa.
 In 2000, the song was interpolated in a rap by British-American documentary filmmaker Louis Theroux. The rap was later remixed in 2022 by Duke & Jones in the single, "Jiggle Jiggle".

References

1967 songs
1968 singles
1983 singles
1988 singles
A&M Records singles
Bang Records singles
Billboard Hot 100 number-one singles
Cashbox number-one singles
Dutch Top 40 number-one singles
Irish Singles Chart number-one singles
Neil Diamond songs
Number-one singles in New Zealand
RPM Top Singles number-one singles
UK Singles Chart number-one singles
Reggae songs
Songs about alcohol
Songs written by Neil Diamond
UB40 songs
Trojan Records singles
Virgin Records singles
Black-and-white music videos